Events during the year 2017 in Poland.

Incumbents 

 President — Andrzej Duda (independent, supported by Law and Justice)
 Prime Minister — Beata Szydło (Law and Justice) (until 11 December), Mateusz Morawiecki (Law and Justice) (starting 11 December)
 Marshal of the Sejm — Marek Kuchciński (Law and Justice)
 Marshal of the Senate — Stanisław Karczewski (Law and Justice)

Events 

1 January - Ełk riots took place at Ełk Kebab restaurant.
12 January – 3,000 U.S. troops are deployed in Poland as part of NATO's Operation Atlantic Resolve.
7 October – "Rosary to the Borders": hundreds of thousands of Polish Catholics prayed the Rosary along the country's borders for peace and for the salvation of Poland and the world against secularization.
November - 100,000 people gather for annual independence day march

Deaths 

1 January – Bogdan Tuszyński, sports journalist, reporter and historian (b. 1932).
7 January – Jerzy Kossela, guitarist and vocalist (b. 1942).
7 January – Lech Trzeciakowski, historian (b. 1931).
27 April – Jan Flinik, field hockey player (b. 1932)

16 June – Mieczysław Kalenik, actor (b. 1933)
2 August – Wanda Chotomska, children's writer, screenwriter and poet (b. 1929)

See also 
 2017 in Polish television

References 

 
2010s in Poland
Poland
Poland